Michelle Ann Jane Goszko (born 7 October 1977) is a former Australian cricketer.  A right-handed batter and occasional right-arm medium pace bowler, she played 4 Test matches for Australia between 2001 and 2006, scoring 217 runs, a low return after making a double-century on her Test debut against England in June 2001.  She has also played 34 One Day Internationals for Australia, scoring 669 runs with an average in the mid-twenties.

References

External links
 
 Michelle Goszko at southernstars.org.au

1977 births
Australia women One Day International cricketers
Australia women Test cricketers
Australia women Twenty20 International cricketers
Cricketers from Sydney
Living people
New South Wales Breakers cricketers
Women cricketers who made a century on Test debut